Wolfgang Schneiderhan may refer to:

 Wolfgang Schneiderhan (general) (born 1946), former general in the German armed forces
 Wolfgang Schneiderhan (violinist) (1915–2002), Austrian classical violinist